The Taller You Are, the Shorter You Get is an album by the American post-punk band My Dad Is Dead, released in 1989 through Homestead Records.

Production
Aside from some bass and accordion, Mark Edwards played all of the instruments on the album.

Critical reception
Trouser Press wrote: "Edwards veers relatively close to the musical mainstream ... with considerable success. His lyrics, meanwhile, have grown less morose and more philosophical, and he sings them with new-found expressiveness." Tiny Mix Tapes wrote that the album "covers everything from pretty, jangly guitar instrumentals to Joy Division- and Devo-referencing New Wave numbers."

Track listing

Personnel

My Dad Is Dead
Mark Edwards – vocals, instruments
Jeff Curtis – bass guitar

Additional musicians and production
Chris Burgess – production, engineering, mixing
Tim Gilbride – photography
James Wilson – accordion on "Sweet Company"

References

1989 albums
My Dad Is Dead albums
Homestead Records albums